Bruno Andrade de Toledo Nascimento (born 30 May 1991) is a Brazilian professional footballer who plays as a centre-back.

Club career
Born in Caçapava, São Paulo, Nascimento started playing football with amateurs Desportivo Brasil. In the middle of 2010 he signed with Portuguese club G.D. Estoril Praia, achieving promotion to the Primeira Liga at the end of the 2011–12 season.

Nascimento made his debut in the Portuguese top flight on 26 August 2012, playing the full 90 minutes in a 1–1 home draw against F.C. Paços de Ferreira. In late January 2013, he was loaned to 1. FC Köln in the 2. Bundesliga, playing his first match on 18 February by coming on as a late substitute in a 1–0 victory over FC St. Pauli; at the end of the campaign, the Germans signed him to a four-year contract for an undisclosed fee.

On 28 August 2014, Nascimento returned to Estoril, this time on a season-long loan deal. The following year, he joined another Primeira Liga club, C.D. Tondela, also on loan.

On 8 July 2016, Nascimento signed a contract with the Cypriot club AC Omonia. On 26 April 2017, having scarcely featured, he was released.

In August 2019 it was confirmed, that Nascimento had joined Manama Club in Bahrain.

On 17 August 2021, Pyunik announced the signing of Nascimento. On 1 June 2022, Nascimento left Pyunik after his contract expired.

Career statistics

Honours
Pyunik
 Armenian Premier League: 2021–22

References

External links

1991 births
Living people
Footballers from São Paulo (state)
Brazilian footballers
Association football defenders
Primeira Liga players
Liga Portugal 2 players
Cypriot First Division players
2. Bundesliga players
Desportivo Brasil players
G.D. Estoril Praia players
C.D. Tondela players
C.D. Feirense players
1. FC Köln players
AC Omonia players
Manama Club players
Brazilian expatriate footballers
Expatriate footballers in Portugal
Expatriate footballers in Germany
Expatriate footballers in Cyprus
Expatriate footballers in Bahrain
Expatriate footballers in Armenia
Brazilian expatriate sportspeople in Portugal
Brazilian expatriate sportspeople in Germany
Brazilian expatriate sportspeople in Cyprus
Brazilian expatriate sportspeople in Bahrain
Brazilian expatriate sportspeople in Armenia